Forever and Ever is the second solo studio album by American singer-songwriter Howard Hewett. It was released in 1988 via Elektra Records. Recording sessions for this ten-track album took place at fourteen various recording studios in California. Production was primarily handled by Hewett, along with Monty Seward, Vincent Brantley, George Duke, Tom Keane, Jerry Knight and Aaron Zigman.

The album peaked at number 110 on the us Billboard 200 album chart and at number 30 on the Top R&B/Hip-Hop Albums chart. It was supported by three hit singles: "Strange Relationship", "Once, Twice, Three Times" and "Forever and Ever". "Strange Relationship" and "Once, Twice, Three Times" made it to the Hot R&B/Hip-Hop Songs chart, reaching nunber 9 and number 15 respectively.

Track listing

Personnel and credits 
Musicians

 Howard Hewett – lead vocals, backing vocals (1, 2, 3, 5–8, 10), vocal arrangements (1-5, 7-10), music arrangements (3)
 Monty Seward – keyboards (1, 3, 6), vocal arrangements (6), synthesizer programming (1, 3-6, 10), music arrangements (1, 3-6, 10), vocal arrangements (6)
 Vincent Brantley – keyboards (2), keyboard bass (2), music arrangements (2)
 David Zeman – keyboards (2), synthesizer programming (2)
 Jeff Carruthers – synthesizer programming (2)
 George Duke – keyboards (3), Synclavier strings (3), Synclavier (8), music arrangements (8)
 Rex Salas – keyboards (4)
 Tom Keane – keyboards (7), backing vocals (7), music arrangements (7), vocal arrangements (7)
 Rhett Lawrence – synthesizer programming (7)
 John Keane – synth bass (7), drum programming (7)
 Jerry Knight – all instruments (9), backing vocals (9), music arrangements (9)
 Aaron Zigman – all instruments (9)
 Paul Jackson Jr. – guitars (1, 3)
 Ray Fuller – guitars (2, 4, 6, 8)
 Michael Landau – guitars (5, 7)
 Norman Merter – guitars (6)
 Kevin Chokan – guitars (10)
 Jim Blair – hi-hat overdubs (1, 2), cymbal overdubs (3), drums (4)
 Tris Imboden – drums (3, 10)
 Paulinho da Costa – percussion (2, 5)
 Gerald Albright – saxophone solo (2, 3, 4)
 Ronnie Laws – saxophone solo (8)
 Lynn Davis – backing vocals (1, 5, 8)
 Josie James – backing vocals (2, 3, 5, 8, 9)
 Karyn White – backing vocals (2, 5, 7)
 Kimaya Seward – backing vocals (3, 6)
 Alex Brown – backing vocals (5)
 Carl Caldwell – backing vocals (5)
 James Ingram – backing vocals (5, 9)
 Phil Perry – backing vocals (5)
 Marva King – backing vocals (9)

Production

 Tommy Vicari – mixing, recording (1, 3, 4, 5, 7, 10)
 Reginald Dozier – recording (2)
 Gary Skardina – recording (2, 4, 5, 6, 9)
 Joel Soyffer – recording (2)
 Sabrina Buchanek – recording (3)
 David Rideau – recording (3)
 Jeffrey 'Woody' Woodruff – recording (7)
 Mitch Gibson – recording (8)
 Erik Zobler – recording (8)
 Gary Wagner – recording (9)
 Gregg Barrett – additional engineer (1), assistant engineer (3–6)
 Cliff Jones – additional engineer (1), assistant engineer (3, 5, 7, 10), recording (6)
 Pat MacDougau – additional engineer (1), assistant engineer (3, 5, 6, 7)
 Linda Pina – additional engineer (1), assistant engineer (4, 6, 7, 10)
 Walter Spencer – additional engineer (1), assistant engineer (3, 4, 5)
 Lori Fumar – assistant engineer (2, 4, 8)
 Toni Greene – assistant engineer (5)
 Brian Gardner – mastering at Bernie Grundman Mastering (Hollywood, California)
 Dina Andrews – production coordinator
 Carol Bobolts – design
 Randee St. Nicholas – photography

Charts

References

External links 

1988 albums
Elektra Records albums
Albums produced by George Duke
Albums produced by Aaron Zigman
Albums produced by Jerry Knight